Statua della Libertà is a statue in Piazza della Libertà, City of San Marino, the capital city of the Republic of San Marino.  Translated this means "Statue of Liberty",  not to be confused with the statue in New York City, United States.

The Statua della Libertà, made in the neoclassical style of white Carrara marble and is located between Parva Domus and the Palazzo Pubblico. It is a work of the sculptor Stefano Galletti and was donated by Countess Otilia Heyroth Wagener from Berlin to the Republic in 1876, because she had become Countess of Acquaviva.

The statue symbolizes freedom. Freedom is represented as a warrior advancing fiercely with one hand extended forward and one with a flag. On the head of the statue is a crown with three towers representing the fortified city of San Marino, the symbolic meaning is the reinstatement of freedom.

The Statua della Libertà is depicted on the Sammarinese 2 cent euro coins.

References

Marble sculptures
Neoclassical sculptures
Buildings and structures in the City of San Marino